Congregatio Canonicorum Sancti Augustini (CCSA) (Congregation of the Canons of St Augustine) is a German High Church religious community of clergy and laymen.

CCSA was founded in Priory of St. Wigbert September 12, 2005 by four men, whose zeal was to bring people closer to the gospel of Jesus Christ in tradition of catholic and apostolic Church. It is led by prior. The Brothers gather together regularly in conventions. As a habit clergy wear a black soutane with black fascia and laity a black tunic in conventions.

See also
Canons Regular

External links
Official website 

Lutheran orders and societies
Christian organizations established in 2005
Christian organizations established in the 21st century